Matías Ezequiel Banco (born 3 July 1989) was an Argentine footballer.

He played for Chilean clubs like Unión San Felipe or Lota Schwager.

References
 
 

1989 births
Living people
Argentine footballers
Argentine expatriate footballers
Independiente Rivadavia footballers
Unión San Felipe footballers
Primera B de Chile players
Chilean Primera División players
Expatriate footballers in Chile
Association football midfielders
Sportspeople from Mendoza, Argentina